Bình Sơn is a rural district (huyện) of Quảng Ngãi province in the South Central Coast region of Vietnam. It is the birthplace of the Vietnamese mandarin and anti-French guerrilla leader Trương Định. As of 2003 the district had a population of 177,943. The district covers an area of 464 km². The district capital lies at Châu Ổ.

References

Districts of Quảng Ngãi province